Robert Harold Bradley (born July 14, 1946) is an American psychologist. He is a professor in the T. Denny Sanford School of Social & Family Dynamics and the Department of Psychology at Arizona State University (ASU), where he is also director of the Center for Child and Family Success. Before joining the faculty at ASU in 2009, he was a professor at the University of Arkansas at Little Rock and an adjunct professor at the University of Arkansas for Medical Sciences. He is a member of the Society for Research in Child Development and the National Council on Family Relations.

References

External links
 Faculty profile

American developmental psychologists
21st-century American psychologists
Living people
1946 births
University of Notre Dame alumni
University of North Carolina at Chapel Hill alumni
Arizona State University faculty
University of Arkansas at Little Rock faculty
University of Arkansas for Medical Sciences faculty
20th-century American psychologists